Events from the year 1915 in Michigan.

Office holders

State office holders

 Governor of Michigan: Woodbridge N. Ferris (Democrat)
 Lieutenant Governor of Michigan: Luren D. Dickinson (Republican) 
 Michigan Attorney General: Grant Fellows (Republican)
 Michigan Secretary of State: Coleman C. Vaughan
 Speaker of the Michigan House of Representatives: Charles W. Smith (Republican)
 Chief Justice, Michigan Supreme Court:

Mayors of major cities

 Mayor of Detroit: Oscar Marx (Republican)
 Mayor of Grand Rapids: George E. Ellis
 Mayor of Saginaw: Ard E. Richardson/Hilem F. Paddock

Federal office holders

 U.S. Senator from Michigan: Charles E. Townsend (Republican)
 U.S. Senator from Michigan: William Alden Smith (Republican) 
 House District 1: Frank Ellsworth Doremus (Democrat)
 House District 2: Samuel Beakes (Democrat)
 House District 3: John M. C. Smith (Republican)
 House District 4: Edward L. Hamilton (Republican)
 House District 5: Carl E. Mapes (Republican)
 House District 6: Samuel William Smith (Republican)/Patrick H. Kelley (Republican)
 House District 7: Louis C. Cramton (Republican)
 House District 8: Joseph W. Fordney (Republican)
 House District 9: James C. McLaughlin (Republican)
 House District 10: Roy O. Woodruff (Progressive)/George A. Loud (Republican)
 House District 11: Francis O. Lindquist (Republican)/Frank D. Scott (Republican)
 House District 12: William Josiah MacDonald (Progressive)/W. Frank James (Republican)

Population

Sports

Baseball

 1915 Detroit Tigers season – The Tigers compiled a 100-54 record, the second best in club history, but finished in second place in the American League behind the Boston Red Sox.  The Tigers' 1915 outfield of Ty Cobb, Sam Crawford, and Bobby Veach finished first, second, and third in the American League in both runs batted in and total bases and was selected by baseball historian Bill James as the best in major league history.
 1915 Michigan Wolverines baseball season - Under head coach Carl Lundgren, the Wolverines compiled a 16–7–3 record. Edmund McQueen was the team captain. George Sisler played first base and pitcher for the team.

American football
 1915 Detroit Heralds season - Under head coach Bill Marshall, the team compiled a 5–1–1 record.
 1915 Michigan Wolverines football team – Under head coach Fielding H. Yost, the Wolverines compiled a 4–3–1 record. 
 1915 Michigan Agricultural Aggies football team –  
 1915 Western State Hilltoppers football team - 
 1915 Michigan State Normal Normalites football team – 
 1910 Detroit Titans football team –

Chronology of events

Births

 January 11 - Lucille Farrier Stickel, wildlife toxicologist whose research on contaminants in wildlife ecosystems and on the pesticide DDT helped form the basis for Rachel Carson's Silent Spring, in Hillman, Michigan
 March 14 - Roy Kellerman, U.S. Secret Service agent assigned to John F. Kennedy when he was assassinated, in New Baltimore, Michigan
 April 10 - Harry Morgan, actor (Bill Gannon on Dragnet, Colonel Sherman T. Potter in M*A*S*H), in Detroit
 April 13 - Bob Devaney, head football coach at Wyoming (1957–1961) and Nebraska (1962–1972), and athletic director at Nebraska (1967–1993), in Saginaw, Michigan
 May 19 - Elman Service, cultural anthropologist who researched Latin American Indian ethnology, cultural evolution, and theory and method in ethnology, in Tecumseh, Michigan
 June 15 - Thomas Huckle Weller, virologist who received Nobel Prize in 1954 for showing how to cultivate poliomyelitis viruses in a test tube, in Ann Arbor, Michigan

Deaths
 November 16 - Julius C. Burrows, United States Senator from Michigan (1895-1911), at age 78 in Kalamazoo

See also
 History of Michigan
 History of Detroit

References